The Netherlands was represented by duo Mouth and MacNeal (Willem Duyn and Maggie MacNeal), with the song "I See a Star", at the 1974 Eurovision Song Contest, which took place in Brighton, England on 6 April. Mouth and MacNeal were internally selected by broadcaster NOS to be the Dutch representatives .

Before Eurovision

Nationaal Songfestival 1974 
The final was held on 27 February 1974 at the Jaarbeurs in Utrecht, hosted by Willem Duys. Only three songs were performed and voted on by a jury. "Ik zie een ster" emerged the runaway winner.

At Eurovision 
The free-language rule applied in 1974, so prior to the contest the song was translated into English as "I See a Star" and performed in English at the final. On the night of the final Mouth and MacNeal performed 12th in the running order, following Belgium and preceding Ireland. In 1974 the voting system reverted to the ten jury members in each country with one vote each model, and at the close of voting "I See a Star" had received 15 points from ten countries, placing the Netherlands 3rd of the 17 entries. The Dutch jury awarded its highest score (4) to Greece. Mouth & MacNeal's upbeat and engaging performance at Eurovision proved memorable, and following the contest "I See a Star" went on to become a major hit across Europe. It reached number 8 on the UK Singles Chart, making it one of only four non-UK / non-winning Eurovision entries to have reached the British top 10 performed by its original artists (the others being "Volare" by Domenico Modugno, third in 1958, and Gigliola Cinquetti's runner-up "Sì", also from 1974 and 2014's Calm After the Storm, by The Common Linnets, also Dutch).

The Dutch conductor at the contest was Harry van Hoof.

Voting

References

External links 
 Dutch Preselection 1974

1974
Countries in the Eurovision Song Contest 1974
Eurovision